Aaron McCloskey (born 20 July 1988), also known by the nickname of "Ivan Drago", is an Irish rugby union and professional rugby league footballer for St. Helens in the Super League, and the Montpellier Red Devils in the Elite One Championship. A former rugby union player with the Garryowen Football Club and Young Munster, and has represented Ireland A-Team at rugby league. He was recruited from Treaty City Titans in Ireland after attending an academy in Limerick.

Background
Aaron McCloskey was born in Limerick, Ireland.

References

External links
Statistics at rugbyleagueproject.org

1988 births
Living people
Expatriate rugby league players in England
Expatriate rugby league players in France
Garryowen Football Club players
McCloskey, A
Irish expatriate rugby league players
Irish expatriate sportspeople in England
Irish expatriate sportspeople in France
McCloskey, A
Irish rugby union players
Montpellier Red Devils players
Rugby league players from County Limerick
Rugby league props
Rugby union players from Limerick (city)
Sportspeople from Limerick (city)
St Helens R.F.C. players
Young Munster players